Heteroblemma is a genus of flowering plants belonging to the family Melastomataceae.

Its native range is Vietnam to Wester. Malesia, New Guinea.

Species:

Heteroblemma alternifolium 
Heteroblemma barbatum 
Heteroblemma bisetosum 
Heteroblemma capillipes 
Heteroblemma clemensiae 
Heteroblemma cordatum 
Heteroblemma coronatum 
Heteroblemma decurrens 
Heteroblemma flagellatum 
Heteroblemma formanii 
Heteroblemma kemulense 
Heteroblemma loratum 
Heteroblemma sandakanense 
Heteroblemma serpens 
Heteroblemma sibauense

References

Melastomataceae
Melastomataceae genera